Durant da Ponte (7 July 1918 – 9 July 1964) was a professor of American literature at the University of Tennessee. He was one of the founders of the Kentucky-Tennessee American Studies Association. Graduate students there can receive the Durant da Ponte American Literature Fellowship, which was founded in his memory.

Life 
Durant da Ponte was born on July 7, 1918 in New Orleans, Louisiana to Harry Graham da Ponte II and Julia Pratt. He was a direct descendant of opera librettist Lorenzo da Ponte. He was the oldest of three children, having a younger sister Lyndall, and a younger brother, Harry Graham da Ponte III. He married Martha Lee Osborne, a former professor of philosophy at the University of Tennessee, and had two children, David and Graham. He died in a plane crash in 1964.

External links
 Don Giovanni in Chestertown
 Harry Da Ponte Biography
 Durant da Ponte American Literature Fellowship at the University of Tennessee

1918 births
1964 deaths
Accidental deaths in Tennessee
University of Tennessee faculty
Victims of aviation accidents or incidents in 1964
Victims of aviation accidents or incidents in the United States